Personal web pages are World Wide Web pages created by an individual to contain content of a personal nature rather than content pertaining to a company, organization or institution.  Personal web pages are primarily used for informative or entertainment purposes but can also be used for personal career marketing (by containing a list of the individual's skills, experience and a CV), social networking with other people with shared interests, or as a space for personal expression.

These terms do not usually refer to just a single "page" or HTML file, but to a collection of webpages and related files under a common URL or Web address.  In strictly technical terms, a site's actual home page (index page) often only contains sparse content with some catchy introductory material and serves mostly as a pointer or table of contents to the more content-rich pages inside, such as résumés, family, hobbies, family genealogy, a web log/diary ("blog"), opinions, online journals and diaries or other writing, examples of written work, digital audio sound clips, digital video clips, digital photos, or information about a user's other interests.  Many personal pages only include information of interest to friends and family of the author. However, some webpages set up by hobbyists or enthusiasts of certain subject areas can be valuable topical web directories.

History
In the 1990s, most Internet Service Providers (ISPs) provided a free small personal, user-created webpage along with free Usenet News service.  These were all considered part of full Internet service. Also several free web hosting services such as Geocities provided free web space for personal web pages.  These free web hosting services would typically include web-based site management and a few pre-configured scripts to easily integrate an input form or guestbook script into the user's site. Early personal web pages were often called "home pages" and were intended to be set as a default page in a web browser's preferences, usually by their owner. These pages would often contain links, to-do lists, and other information their author found useful. In the days when search engines were in their infancy, these pages (and the links they contained) could be an important resource in navigating the web. Since the early 2000s, the rise of blogging and the development of user friendly web page designing software made it easier for amateur users who did not have computer programming or website designer training to create personal web pages. Some website design websites provided free ready-made blogging scripts, where all the user had to do was input their content into a template. At the same time, a personal web presence became easier with the increased popularity of social networking services, some with blogging platforms such as LiveJournal and Blogger. These websites provided an attractive and easy-to-use content management system for regular users. Most of the early personal websites were Web 1.0 style, in which a static display of text and images or photos was displayed to individuals who came to the page. About the only interaction that was possible on these early websites was signing the virtual "guestbook".

With the collapse of the dot-com bubble in the late 1990s, the ISP industry consolidated, and the focus of web hosting services shifted away from the surviving ISP companies to independent Internet hosting services and to ones with other affiliations.  For example, many university departments provided personal pages for professors  and television broadcasters provided them for their on-air personalities. These free webpages served as a  perquisite ("perk") for staff, while at the same time boosting the Web visibility of the parent organization.  Web hosting companies either charge a monthly fee, or provide service that is "free" (advertising based) for personal web pages.  These are priced or limited according to the total size of all files in bytes on the host's hard drive, or by bandwidth, (traffic), or by some combination of both.  For those customers who continue to use their ISP for these services, national ISPs commonly continue to provide both disk space and help including ready-made drop-in scripts.

With the rise of Web 2.0-style websites, both professional websites and user-created, amateur websites tended to contain interactive features, such as "clickable" links to online newspaper articles or favourite websites, the option to comment on content displayed on the website, the option to "tag" images, videos or links on the site, the option of "clicking" on an image to enlarge it or find out more information, the option of user participation for website guests to evaluate or review the pages, or even the option to create new user-generated content for others to see. A key difference between Web 1.0 personal webpages and Web 2.0 personal pages was while the former tended to be created by hackers, computer programmers and computer hobbyists, the latter were created by a much wider variety of users, including individuals whose main interests lay in hobbies or topics outside of computers (e.g., indie music fans, political activists, and social entrepreneurs).

Motivations

In a study done by Zinkhan, participants had four main reasons to create personal web pages. First, people use personal web pages as a portrayal of self, in a sense marketing themselves, since creators have the freedom to portray their own identities. Second, personal web pages are a way to interact with people who have similar interests as the creator, possible employers, or  colleagues. Third, personal web pages can gain social acceptance with groups that the creator is interested in depending on the information that the creator reveals about themselves. Fourth, personal web pages can give creators a sense of connection to the world since these web pages are public and a way to introduce oneself to other people around the globe.

People may maintain personal web pages to serve as a showcase for their skills in professional life, creative skills or self promotion of their business, charity or band. The use of personal web pages to display an individuals professional life has become more common in the 21st century. Mary Madden, an expert researcher on privacy and technology, did a study that found a tenth of American jobs require Personal web pages that advertise an individual online. Personal web pages have become a source of initial impression of possible employees used by employers. It can also be used to express opinions on issues ranging from news and politics to movies. Others may use their personal web page as a communication method. For example, an aspiring artist might give out business cards with their personal web page, and invite people to visit their page and see their artwork, "like" their page or sign their guestbook.

A personal web page gives the owner generally more control on presence in search results and how they wish to be viewed online. It also allows more freedom in types and quantity of content than a social network profile offers, and can link various social media profiles with each other. It can be used to correct the record on something, or clear up potential confusion between you and someone with the same name.

In the 2010s, some amateur writers, bands and filmmakers release digital versions of their stories, songs and short films online, with the aim of gaining an audience and becoming more well-known. While the huge number of aspiring artists posting their work online makes it unlikely for individuals and groups to become popular via the Internet, there are a small number of YouTube stars who were unknown until their online performances garnered them a huge audience.

Contrast with social network accounts

Both individual, personal web sites and personal social networking accounts give the user a personally customized Web presence.  In the 2010s most casual Internet users join free social networking services such as Twitter or Facebook to serve many of the same purposes as a personal webpage without having to learn web design and writing HTML markup. That prerequisite is not required, as Web hosting services provide more help to enable regular users to create Web pages.

Social networks often used prefabricated "black box" structures. On one hand, these templates are much easier for neophyte users to work with, since users simply have to add in information in spaces which indicate the required information. Once the user "saves" or finishes entering the information, the social network website's software system automatically creates a fairly professional-looking layout. "Black box" templates are much simpler to begin using and navigating, but more  advanced users may be frustrated that they cannot "tweak" the formatting, amount of content, type of content, etc.  For example, most social networks have rules regarding casual users who are uploading (loading files onto the website) audio files to their account.  Furthermore, these companies intentionally retain the specific service's look and feel and identity of each user personal account within that corporate social network.  For example, all profiles may have the same background color, font and website trademark. The emphasis there is on being part of a branded "network," not on the "personal," or the individual.  Thus, these accounts are not normally thought of as (personal) web sites or home pages.

There are other differences.  Unlike actual personal web pages, social networking services and ad-based "free" web hosting service personnel, advertisers and nanny-bots can see everything inside the user accounts, and rules are enforced by the firm, not by the courts as would be the case with a personally owned, full-featured personal web page.  However some social services allow the display of almost any content or media produced by the site's creator.  This avenue of distribution satisfies most amateurs and aspiring content creators.  Web site creation tools permitted by some companies have the potential to allow users more flexibility. As a rule of thumb, the amount of creative freedom one is allowed in creating a personal Web page can be predicted by the site's URL.  A pure URL similar to www.yourname.com predicts total ownership and the resulting rights.  But a shared-name URL similar to www.yourname.home.othercompany.com suggests account rental and regulations which benefit or protect a corporation (in this case, Othercompany Inc).

"Free" sites based on advertising revenue face the dilemma that while relaxation of the rules encourages users to post their feelings and opinions and upload user-generated content with less fear of being censored or shut down, it also increases the risk of an offended sponsor pulling its sponsorship, if offensive materials or comments are made online.  With more uploading and content-posting freedom comes an increased risk of copyright and defamation lawsuits, hate speech charges and other legal problems.  Free hosting services do not allow users many options to customize the look of pages, because this would reduce page uniformity, thus reducing the common "look and feel" on the website, which becomes a key part of its identity and "branding".  In short, if a social networking company allowed total personal freedom of content posting and profile modification for users, it also risks a degradation of its own look-and-feel, branding, function, and profit and legal risks.  In the 2010s, this balance of interests is leading toward more user choices and a narrowing of the differences between personal web sites and other personal web presence providers.

Official celebrity sites

Many celebrities from the movies, TV shows, professional sports and popular music have websites.  Were their owners not famous, some might think due to their tone and personal ambiance that these sites were personal web pages.  However, the celebrity is the "product" or brand being sold, and however casual a celebrity website may appear, with short blog posts and comments appearing on a regular basis, these are typically professionally authored and maintained. Some celebrities' public relations firms and managers hire ghostwriters to author blog posts and Tweets in the style of the celebrity.  The celebrity status of the subject and the existence of separate fan-created sites (over which the celebrity in question has no direct control) leads the existence of multiple websites for each celebrity: a personal site authorized by the celebrity and maintained by an individual or company directly associated with the celebrity to be labeled an "official website", and one or more fan-run websites.  This designation is often a seal of approval and an assurance to the public that the information provided on the site (including press releases, tour dates, and promotional materials) has been authored or approved by the celebrity in question.  Some celebrities involved in criminal and civil trials, such as late pop star Michael Jackson and media mogul Martha Stewart, as well as celebrity chef Paula Deen establish official websites to issue statements to the press and to respond to statements and press releases issued by the prosecuting officials. Most celebrity sites are created and maintained by marketing and web professionals employed by the celebrity or the celebrity's publicist; however, some celebrities, such as film director Roger Avary, actor Wil Wheaton, and video game developer John Romero, maintain their own official sites without professional help, although many of them still use third-party templates and blogging software.

Sites of academics
Academic professionals (especially at the college and university level), including professors and researchers, are often given online space for creating and storing personal web documents, including personal web pages, CVs and a list of their books, academic papers and conference presentations, on the websites of their employers.  This goes back to the early decade of the World Wide Web and its original purpose of providing a quick and easy way for academics to share research papers and data.

Researchers may have a personal website to share more information about themselves, about their academic activities and for sharing (unpublished) results of their research. This has been noted as part of the success of open-access repositories such as arXiv.

See also
 Blog
 Blog hosting service
 Digerati
 Electronic portfolio
 Home server
 IndieWeb
 Social networking service
 Web hosting service

References

Websites
Web 1.0
Web 2.0
Personal life
New media
Diaries
Social media